This is a list of the mammal species recorded in Sri Lanka, with their respective names in Sinhala also listed. There are 125 mammal species in Sri Lanka, of which one is critically endangered, ten are endangered, ten are vulnerable, and three are near threatened.

The following tags are used to highlight each species' conservation status as assessed by the International Union for Conservation of Nature:

Some species were assessed using an earlier set of criteria. Species assessed using this system have the following instead of near threatened and least concern categories:

Mammalian diversity

Order: Proboscidea (elephants)

Order: Sirenia (manatees and dugongs) 
Sirenia is an order of fully aquatic, herbivorous mammals that inhabit rivers, estuaries, coastal marine waters, swamps, and marine wetlands. All four species are endangered.

Genus: Dugong
Dugong, D. dugon  මුහුදු ඌරා

Order: Primates 
The order Primates contains humans and their closest relatives: lemurs, lorisoids, monkeys, and apes.

Order: Rodentia (rodents) 
Rodents make up the largest order of mammals, with over 40% of mammalian species. They have two incisors in the upper and lower jaw which grow continually and must be kept short by gnawing.

Order: Lagomorpha (lagomorphs) 

The lagomorphs comprise two families, Leporidae (hares and rabbits), and Ochotonidae (pikas). Though they can resemble rodents, and were classified as a superfamily in that order until the early 20th century, they have since been considered a separate order. They differ from rodents in a number of physical characteristics, such as having four incisors in the upper jaw rather than two.

Order: Soricomorpha (shrews, moles, and solenodons) 
The "shrew-forms" are insectivorous mammals. The shrews and solenodons closely resemble mice, while the moles are stout-bodied burrowers.

Order: Chiroptera (bats) 
The bats' most distinguishing feature is that their forelimbs are developed as wings, making them the only mammals capable of flight. Bat species account for about 20% of all mammals.

Order: Pholidota (pangolins) 
The order Pholidota comprises the eight species of pangolin. Pangolins are anteaters and have the powerful claws, elongated snout and long tongue seen in the other unrelated anteater species.

Order: Cetacea (cetaceans) 
The order Cetacea includes whales, dolphins and porpoises. They are the mammals most fully adapted to aquatic life with a spindle-shaped nearly hairless body, protected by a thick layer of blubber, and forelimbs and tail modified to provide propulsion underwater.

Order: Carnivora (carnivorans) 
There are over 260 species of carnivorans, the majority of which feed primarily on meat. They have a characteristic skull shape and dentition.

Order: Artiodactyla (even-toed ungulates) 
The even-toed ungulates are ungulates whose weight is borne about equally by the third and fourth toes, rather than mostly or entirely by the third as in perissodactyls. There are about 220 artiodactyl species, including many that are of great economic importance to humans.

See also
Wildlife of Sri Lanka
List of chordate orders
Lists of mammals by region
Mammal classification

Further reading
Mammals of Sri Lanka by Asoka Yapa and Gamini Ratnavira,

Notes

References
 

 
Mammals, 01
Sri Lanka
 Sri Lanka
Sri Lanka